Alejandro Patricio "Alex" Martínez Tapia  (born 26 October 1959) is a Chilean former footballer.

References

1959 births
Living people
Association football defenders
Chilean footballers
Olympic footballers of Chile
Footballers at the 1984 Summer Olympics
Club Deportivo Universidad Católica footballers
Universidad de Chile footballers
San Luis de Quillota footballers
Everton de Viña del Mar footballers
1987 Copa América players
Chile international footballers